Comment c'est loin: L'album du film is the second studio album by Casseurs Flowters, a French hip hop duo consisting of rappers Orelsan and Gringe, and the soundtrack album for their eponymous 2015 film. It was released on 9 December 2015 by 3e Bureau, 7th Magnitude and Wagram Music in France.

The album entered the French Albums Chart on 30 November 2015, just over a week before its release, charting at number 78 and peaking at number 24. The album has received generally positive reviews from music critics, and was certified platinum in France in January 2017.

Background
On 23 September 2014, in an interview with Melty, Orelsan attempted to explain the success of his and Gringe's debut studio album as a duo, Orelsan et Gringe sont les Casseurs Flowters, stating: "It's an album that kind of talks about everyday life, and which speaks to regular people in our age group." When asked about the possibility of a third solo studio album (following Le chant des sirènes from 2011), he admitted that it was something that he had "not started doing", though he promised to "get on it quickly".

On 21 March 2015, Orelsan posted a photo of a script with the working title Orel et Gringe (Orel and Gringe) on his Instagram page. He followed up with another post on 4 May, this time of himself with Gringe in the film, confirming that shooting for the film was complete and that its title would be Comment c'est loin.

Singles
Comment c'est loin: L'album du film has produced 1 single:
 "À l'heure où je me couche" was released as the album's lead single on 29 October 2015. It peaked at number 34 on the French Singles Chart.

Track listing

Notes
 "J'essaye, j'essaye" features additional vocals by Janine.

Sample credits
 "Au bout du compte" contains samples of "Snakes & Ladders (Part Two)" by Wiley.

Charts

Weekly charts

Year-end charts

Certifications

Release history

References

2015 soundtrack albums
Orelsan albums
Casseurs Flowters albums
Collaborative albums
French-language soundtracks
7th Magnitude albums
Comedy film soundtracks